The 1986 Five Nations Championship was the fifty-seventh series of the rugby union Five Nations Championship. Including the previous incarnations as the Home Nations and Five Nations, this was the ninety-second series of the northern hemisphere rugby union championship. Ten matches were played over five weekends between 18 January and 15 March. 

France and Scotland shared the title. Phillipe Sella of France scored a try in every match, repeating the feat achieved three years earlier by fellow Frenchman Patrick Estève.

This championship marked a turnaround in the fortunes of the Irish team who won the competition the previous year, but took home the wooden spoon.

Participants
The teams involved were:

Table

Squads

Results

See also
 Five Nations XV v Overseas Unions XV

External links
1986 Five Nations Championship Data

Six Nations Championship seasons
Five Nations Championship
Five Nations
Five Nations
Five Nations
Five Nations
Five Nations
  
Five Nations
Five Nations
Five Nations